The Metro Jets are a non-sanctioned junior ice hockey team that plays their home games at Mount Clemens Ice Arena in Mount Clemens, Michigan. They are members of the Great Lakes Conference in the United States Premier Hockey League's Premier Division. Players are ages 16–20, carry amateur status under Junior A guidelines and hope to earn a spot on higher levels of junior ice hockey in the United States and Canada, Canadian major junior, collegiate, and eventually professional teams. The Jets won the 2002 USA Hockey Junior B Silver Cup national championship.

History
The organization was founded by Hal "Butch" and Mary Kay Wolfe as a member of the Metro Detroit Junior Hockey League, a Junior B league sanctioned by USA Hockey, beginning with the 1989–90 season. The Metro Jets played their first season at Inkster Ice Arena in Inkster, Michigan, and then the next 25 seasons at Lakeland Arena in Waterford Township, Michigan. The Metro Detroit Junior Hockey League rebranded back to Central States Hockey League (CSHL) in 1994 and then moved up to Tier III Junior A in 2007. In 2010, the CSHL was rebranded as the North American 3 Hockey League (NA3HL).

In 2015, the Metro Jets were sold to Peter Cammick and began playing at Fraser Hockeyland in Fraser, Michigan. The Jets left the NA3HL in 2018 for the Premier Division of the United States Premier Hockey League. The Jets also added their development team to the USPHL Premier after the Lake Erie Bighorns withdrew prior to the 2018–19 season.

In 2021, the organization moved to Mount Clemens, Michigan, to play out of the Mount Clemens Ice Arena and added Professional Broadcaster, Matt Prieur to serve as the Voice of the Metro Jets Hockey Club.

2022 is the 34th year of operation for the Metro Jets Hockey Club and Fifth year of operation for MJDP (Metro Jets Development Program)

Alumni
The Metro Jets have had several alumni move on to higher levels of junior ice hockey, NCAA Division I, Division III, ACHA college, at professional levels. Jon Cooper coached the Jets to the 2002 USA Hockey Silver Cup National Junior B Championship and later became the head coach of the Tampa Bay Lightning. Steven Oleksy was the first Jets' alumni to play in the National Hockey League when he made his debut with the Washington Capitals in 2013.

Season-by-season records

References

External links
 Official website

Amateur ice hockey teams in Michigan
Ice hockey teams in Detroit
1989 establishments in Michigan
Ice hockey clubs established in 1989
Macomb County, Michigan